Calcagno is an Italian surname. Notable people with the surname include:
Domenico Calcagno (born 1943), Italian cardinal
Eric Calcagno (born 1967), Argentine sociologist, journalist, diplomat and politician
Fortunato Calcagno (1900-1966), Italian lawyer, politician and officer
Francesco Calcagno (1528–1550), Franciscan friar
Giuseppa Bolognara Calcagno (1826–1884), Italian revolutionary
Lawrence Calcagno (1913–1993), American painter
Raimundo Calcagno (1906–1982), Argentine film critic, journalist and screenwriter
Robert Calcagno (born 1960), Monegasque politician
Umberto Calcagno (born 1970), Italian footballer

See also
 Calcagno (cheese)

Italian-language surnames